The Baháʼí Faith has eleven holy days, which are important anniversaries in the history of the religion. On nine of these holy days, work is suspended. There is no fixed format for any of the holy days, and Baháʼí communities organize their own commemorative meetings.

All but two of the holy days are scheduled annually on fixed dates in the Baháʼí calendar. The Twin Holy Birthdays are scheduled annually according to a lunar calculation.

Besides the eleven holy days, Baháʼís also celebrate Ayyám-i-Há, a period of several extra days in the calendar (followed by the Nineteen Day Fast).

Table of dates

Historical dates

Holy Days of the Bahá’í calendar

General holy days

Naw-Rúz
Annually on Bahá 1.marks the beginning of spring
See Naw-Rúz

Holy days associated with the Báb

The Birth of the Báb
Annually in October or November. The Báb was born two years after Baháʼu'lláh, on the first of the Twin Holy Birthdays.

Declaration of the Báb
Annually on ʻAẓamat 8. See Declaration of the Bab to Mullá Husayn

Martyrdom of the Báb
Annually on Raḥmat 17. See Martyrdom of the Báb

Holy days associated with Baháʼu'lláh

The Birth of Baha'u'llah
Annually in October or November. Baháʼu'lláh was born on the second of the Twin Holy Birthdays. See also: Birth of Baha'u'llah.

Festival of Ridván
The Festival of Ridván, a twelve-day festival that commemorates Baháʼu'lláh's announcement to be the Manifestation of God, is the most holy Baháʼí festival to which Baháʼu'lláh referred as the "Most Great Festival." The first, ninth and twelfth days of the festival are celebrated as holy days.

Annually on Jalál 13, Jamál 2 and Jamál 5.

See Festival of Ridván.

Ascension of Baháʼu'lláh
Annually on ʻAẓamat 13.

Holy days associated with ʻAbdu'l-Bahá
On these two holy days, the suspension of work is not required.

Day of the Covenant
Annually on Qawl 4. See Day of the Covenant

Ascension of ʻAbdu'l-Bahá
Annually on Qawl 6. See Ascension of ʻAbdu'l-Bahá

Twin Holy Birthdays
The Twin Holy Birthdays of the Báb and Baháʼu'lláh are celebrated on the first and second day following the eighth new moon after Naw-Rúz. (In the Islamic lunar calendar, the births of the Báb and Baháʼu'lláh fell on consecutive days - the first and second day of Muharram, respectively, two years apart.)

See Twin Holy Birthdays and Birth of Baha'u'llah.

See also
Baháʼí calendar

References

Further reading
 Baháʼí World Centre (2017). Days of Remembrance - Selections from the Writings of Baháʼu'lláh for Baháʼí Holy Days.

External links
 Baháʼí Dates 172 to 221 B.E. (2015 – 2065; prepared by the Baháʼí World Centre) (pdf)
 Feasts & Holy Days (dynamic display of Holy Days, adjusted by year for your position - correct before and after 2015)
 Related documents on Baháʼí Library Online

Bahá'í holy days